Miguel Kiala (born 10 November 1990 in Luanda, Angola), is a professional Angolan basketball player. Kiala, who is 204 cm (6'4") in height and weighs 91 kg (200 pounds), plays as a Center. He represented Angola at the 2011 FIBA Africa Championship.
Kiala was the top rebounder at the 2009 U-19 FIBA World Championship in New Zealand, with an average 13.6 rpg.

He is currently playing for Petro Atlético at the Angolan major basketball league BAI Basket.

Achievements

See also
 Angola national basketball team

References

External links
 2009 U-19 FIBA World Cup Stats
 2008 U-18 FIBA Africa Championship Stats
 AfricaBasket Profile
 RealGM Profile

1990 births
Living people
Basketball players from Luanda
Angolan men's basketball players
Centers (basketball)
Atlético Petróleos de Luanda basketball players
G.D. Interclube men's basketball players
African Games bronze medalists for Angola
African Games medalists in basketball
Competitors at the 2011 All-Africa Games